Allaria was a town and polis (city-state) of ancient Crete. Allaria minted coins bearing on the obverse the head of Athena Pallas, and on the reverse a figure of Heracles standing, some of which coins have been preserved. Cnopias of Allaria, a native, commanded Cretan mercenaries hired by the Ptolemaic Army at the Battle of Raphia (217 BCE).

Its site is tentatively located near Khamalevri.

References

Populated places in ancient Crete
Former populated places in Greece
Cretan city-states